1848 convention may refer to:

 The Seneca Falls Convention
 The Rochester Women's Rights Convention of 1848
 The 1848 Democratic National Convention
 The 1848 Whig National Convention
 The 1848 Free Soil & Liberty national Conventions
 The Industrial Congress National Convention, 1848
 The 1848 Constitutional Convention of Seneca People that established the Seneca Nation of New York
 The Prague Slavic Congress, 1848
 The 1848 founding convention of the Free Soil Party
 The 1848 International Peace Congress in Brussels